The British Virgin Islands competed at the 15th Pan American Games held in Rio de Janeiro, Brazil from 13 to 29 July 2007.

Results by event

See also
 British Virgin Islands at the 2008 Summer Olympics

External links
 Rio 2007 Official website

Nations at the 2007 Pan American Games
P
2007